Deane Montgomery (September 2, 1909 – March 15, 1992) was an American mathematician specializing in topology who was one of the contributors to the final resolution of Hilbert's fifth problem in the 1950s.  He served as president of the American Mathematical Society from 1961 to 1962.

Born in the small town of Weaver, Minnesota, he received his B.S. from Hamline University in St. Paul, MN and his Master's and Ph.D. from the University of Iowa in 1933; his dissertation advisor was Edward Chittenden.

In 1941 Montgomery was awarded a Guggenheim Fellowship. In 1988, he was awarded the American Mathematical Society Leroy P. Steele Prize for Lifetime Achievement.

He was a member of the United States National Academy of Sciences, the American Philosophical Society, and of the American Academy of Arts and Sciences.

Publications
 with Leo Zippin: 
 
 with Leo Zippin: 
 with Leo Zippin: 
 Deane Montgomery and Leo Zippin, Topological Transformation Groups, Interscience Publishers, 1955.
 with Hans Samelson and C. T. Yang: 
 with C. T. Yang:

References

External links

Interview with Montgomery about his experience at Princeton
A biography of Montgomery
A Tribute to Deane Montgomery, by Ronald Fintushel

20th-century American mathematicians
Members of the United States National Academy of Sciences
Topologists
Institute for Advanced Study faculty
University of Iowa alumni
1909 births
1992 deaths
Presidents of the American Mathematical Society
Hamline University alumni
Mathematicians from Minnesota
Presidents of the International Mathematical Union

Members of the American Philosophical Society